Ncamagoro Constituency is an electoral constituency in the Kavango West Region of Namibia.  the constituency had 6,494 registered voters.

Ncamagoro was created in August 2013, following a recommendation of the Fourth Delimitation Commission of Namibia, and in preparation of the 2014 general election. The administrative centre of Ncamagoro Constituency is the village of Ncamagoro. Ncamagoro was formed from the southern part of the Kapako Constituency.

Politics
As in all Kavango West constituencies, SWAPO won the 2015 regional election by a landslide. Johannes Sikondo received 1,504 votes, followed by Faustinus Kauma Mangundu of the All People's Party (APP, 77 votes). Sikondo was re-elected in the 2020 regional election, winning with 902 votes, 89% of the total. Londrike Erastus of the Independent Patriots for Change (IPC) came distant second with 110 votes.

See also
 Administrative divisions of Namibia

References

Constituencies of Kavango West Region
States and territories established in 2013
2013 establishments in Namibia